WFMX (107.9 FM, "107-9 the Mix") is an adult contemporary-formatted radio station licensed to Skowhegan, Maine.

Programming
The station brands itself as having  The Big Mix Weekend featuring music from the 1980s & 1990s, reairs of American Top 40 from the 1980s with countdown legend Casey Kasem.

History 
WFMX went on the air March 17, 1990 as a satellite fed oldies format under the call letters WHQO (Standing for "Headquarters for Oldies") changing a few years later to a community-based AC format as "The Light at the end of the dial". In the late 1990s, as ownership of the station changed frequently the station changed formats several times. Including simulcasting the sports of WSKW (1996–1999), top 40 as "The Party 108" (1999–2000), talk both simulcasting WVOM-FM from Bangor and solo before flipping to the current "Mix 107.9" in February 2005. In 1999 an effort was made to donate the station to Maine Public Radio; the donation was never completed, as it was contingent on a never-completed sale of Mountain Wireless' stations to Cumulus Media.

In February 2007, the call letters were changed to WFMX, to more closely resemble the "Mix" name. Those calls were previously used by what is now WVBZ when it was licensed to Statesville, North Carolina. A power increase was granted as well, improving the signal to the south. WFMX had been working with the developers of the Hathaway Creative Center in Waterville with intentions anchor the refurbished mill in late 2008. Agreeable terms could not be met, so WFMX and its cluster-mates took occupancy of new space on Kennedy Memorial Drive in Waterville.

On April 23, 2013, WFMX was granted for a construction permit to increase its ERP up to 32,000 watts and to raise their HAAT up to 129 meters (423 feet). The station was licensed with the new facilities on April 18, 2016.  For part of WFMX's Adult contemporary format, they aired Delilah's love songs.  Then in 2017, WFMX became a classic hits / hot AC format.  With the repositioning of today's music and classic hits, the station shelved Delilah's program for local talent and more music nights.

WFMX main studios are now located at The Lee Farm Mall on Western Avenue in Augusta, with additional facilities at Penny Hill Park in Waterville.

On Air Personalities
Jay Hanson (Mornings)
Desiree (Mornings)
Mark Jackson
Chris Rush
Jon James 
Kyle Williams
Paul DeFrancisco

Syndicated Talent

Casey Kasem (American Top 40-The 80s from Premiere Networks)

News

News service: WGME-TV News Team 13 (CBS affiliate)
Weather: AccuWeather

References

External links
WFMX "Big Mix Weekend"

Mainstream adult contemporary radio stations in the United States
Radio stations established in 1990
FMX
Skowhegan, Maine
Somerset County, Maine
1990 establishments in Maine